11th Hour is an Indian Telugu-language crime thriller web series created by Introupe Online for aha, directed by Praveen Sattaru, starring Tamannaah in the lead role. The series is based on Upendra Namburi's book 8 Hours, in which the protagonist Aratrika Reddy (Tamannaah) faces a multi-layered high-stakes boardroom challenge that unfolds in a single night.

Synopsis 
Aditya Group of Companies, which invented a source of clean energy and is led by Aratrika Reddy, is on the verge of being forced into bankruptcy as the result of a political conspiracy. With the company required to deposit more than Rs 9,000 crore to the Imperial Bank by 8 AM, the next dawn, to secure its salvation, Aratrika's ex-husband, Siddharth Singh, competitor Rajvardhan Rathore, Imperial Bank president Sundar Das, and Prince Sadiq, a sheikh from Dubai, make financial proposals to Aratrika, who turns them all down and holds out hope, for a miracle, before sunrise to save Aditya Group of Companies.

Cast
Tamannaah as Aratrika Reddy
Adith Arun as Peter D'Cruz
Vamsi Krishna as Siddharth Kumar
Roshni Prakash as Ragini 
Shatru as Rajvardhan Rathore
Madhusudhan Rao as Madhusudhan Reddy
Jayaprakash as Jagannath Reddy
Pavithra Lokesh as Gayatri Reddy
Anirudh Balaji as Prince Sadiq
Vinay Nallakadi as Santosh 
Abhijeeth Poondla as Vikram
Srikanth Iyyengar as Sundar Das
Priya Banerjee as Nora
Ravi Varma as Gajendra Singh Rathore
Avinash Kanaparthi as Avinash Reddy
Mahati Bhikshu as Shabnam
Keshav Deepak as ACP Ram Reddy
Rajiv Kumar Aneja as Defence Minister Nayak

Episodes

Production 
Pradeep Uppalapati wrote the script for 11th Hour, after which aha green-lit the series as part of its aha originals. Praveen Sattaru selected as the director. Tamannaah appeared in the lead role. With Tamannaah on board, the director chose a supporting cast that can also hold attention, comprising Jayaprakash, Madhusudhan, Arun Adith, Vamsi Krishna and Srikanth Iyengar. The series was shot over 33 days with a team of 30-40 members, who were tested six times for COVID-19. Most portions were filmed in a hotel when occupancy was low because of the pandemic. A few prologue scenes were filmed in other places.

Release 

Reception 
Hemanth Kumar of Firstpost rated the series 2.5/5 and wrote: "11th Hour has scale, grandeur, and a solid premise but fails to keep one hooked to the story." While the motivations of the characters are established, Kumar felt that the narration was not compelling enough. A. Kameshwari in her The Indian Express review stated: "The makers of 11th Hour, a corporate drama, try too hard to make the series interesting but in vain." She felt that the audience could not connect with the character of Tamannaah as it was kept half baked.

Times of India critic Sravan Vanaparthy rated the series 3/5 stars and wrote: "11th Hour is refreshing in the sense that it explores the trials and tribulations faced by a woman who’s looking to make it big in a man’s world." India Today editor Janani.K  called Tamannaah the saviour of "this bland thriller." "As a single mom, chairman of a company and caring daughter, Tamannaah has done her best. But, her efforts go waste as the writing lacks nuance," she added.

References

External links 

 
 11th Hour at aha

Aha (streaming service) original programming
Indian thriller television series
2021 web series debuts
Indian drama web series
Telugu-language web series
2021 web series endings